Hans J. H. Boerstra (born 6 January 1965) is a former Dutch international cricketer who represented the Dutch national side between 1991 and 1996. He played as a right-arm medium-pace bowler.

Boerstra was born in Voorburg, South Holland, and played his club cricket for Voorburg Cricket Club (VCC). He made his debut for the Netherlands in August 1991, in a one-day match against the West Indies (returning from a tour of England). Boerstra made his List A debut in June 1995, in a NatWest Trophy game against Northamptonshire. He made another NatWest Trophy appearance the following year, against Surrey, but played no further matches for the national team after that year.

References

External links
Player profile and statistics at Cricket Archive
Player profile and statistics at ESPNcricinfo

1965 births
Living people
Dutch cricketers
Sportspeople from Voorburg